Wen Spencer (born 1963) is an American science fiction and fantasy writer whose books center on characters with unusual abilities. In 2003, she was the winner of the John W. Campbell Award for Best New Writer.

Spencer was raised on a family farm in Evans City, Pennsylvania and attended the University of Pittsburgh, earning a degree in Information science, and has been active in science fiction fandom. Her Ukiah Oregon series features a partly alien character with gentle nature, powerful abilities, and dangerous, werewolf like relatives. Her Tinker universe features a young woman of extraordinary brilliance who is turned into an elf.  A Brother's Price posits a  world where the gender birth ratio is skewed heavily toward baby girls.

Published works

Ukiah Oregon series 
Alien Taste (2001), Compton Crook Award winner
Tainted Trail (2002)
Bitter Waters (2003)
Dog Warrior (2004)

Tinker (Elfhome) series 
 Fantasy novels set in near-future Pittsburgh and Elfhome
Tinker (2003), 2004 Sapphire Award for the Best Science Fiction Romance novel
Wolf Who Rules (2006)
Elfhome (2012)
Wood Sprites (2014)
Harbinger - (April 2022)
 Project Elfhome - (2016) Collection of novelettes and short stories from the Elfhome series
 Steel City Magic – Science Fiction Book Club omnibus edition of Tinker and Wolf Who Rules (April 2006)
Short stories set in the Elfhome Universe

Stand-alone novels 
 A Brother's Price (2005)
 Endless Blue (2007)
 Eight Million Gods (2013)
 The Black Wolves of Boston (2017)

Short stories 
 Set in the Elfhome Universe
 "Wyvern" in Faire Tales (2004), Elfhome #0.5
 "Bare Snow Falling on Fairywood" (2014), Elfhome #0.9
 "Pittsburgh Backyard and Garden" in Free Short Stories 2013 (2013), Elfhome #1.1
 "Blue Sky" (2012), Elfhome #2.5
 "Peace Offering" in Free Short Stories 2012 (2012), Elfhome #3.1
 "Once Upon a Toad" in Fantastic Companions (2005)
 "Another Man's Meat" in Triangulation 2004: A Confluence of Speculative Fiction (2004)
 "Moon Monkeys" in Adventures in Sol System (2004)
 "Rituals for a New God" in Turn the Other Chick (2004)
 "Young Robots in Love" in Triangulation 2003: A Confluence of Speculative Fiction (2003)
 "Protection Money" in Jim Baen's Universe (2006), (later part of Elfhome #3)

References

External links 
 
 
Full Length Commentary on A Brother's Price
Tinker (Elfhome) on Goodreads
Ukiah Oregon on Goodreads

21st-century American novelists
American fantasy writers
American science fiction writers
American women short story writers
American women novelists
John W. Campbell Award for Best New Writer winners
1963 births
Living people
Writers from Pittsburgh
University of Pittsburgh alumni
Women science fiction and fantasy writers
21st-century American women writers
21st-century American short story writers
Novelists from Pennsylvania